Sarah G Live! was an evening musical show in the Philippines hosted by Sarah Geronimo. It was co-hosted by Luis Manzano. It was premiered on February 26, 2012. It airs Sunday nights on ABS-CBN. It features different segments showcasing Geronimo's singing and dancing capabilities. It was ended on February 10, 2013.

Format
The show usually starts with an opening song and dance number by Geronimo together with G-Force. The opening act features different songs from Beyoncé, Katy Perry, Rihanna, Britney Spears, Christina Aguilera, etc. It also airs different segments like Sige Go!, Sarah Loves You, Swag, Sine Gang and Smash-up. On her final song, Geronimo frequently states her message for the viewers and sings her statement song.

Hosts

Main host
Sarah Geronimo

Co-host
Luis Manzano

Award
21st KBP Golden Dove Awards 2013's Best Variety Program.

See also
 List of programs broadcast by ABS-CBN
 Sarah G. Presents
 The Sharon Cuneta Show

References

External links
 Official Website
 
 
 

ABS-CBN original programming
Philippine variety television shows
2012 Philippine television series debuts
2013 Philippine television series endings
Filipino-language television shows